Yukon is a ghost town located within Jacksonville, Florida. The Navy closed the town in July 1963 as it was deemed a flight and safety hazard for nearby Jacksonville Naval Air Station.
George Smoot was born here in 1945.

External links
Jacksonville's Ghost Town: Yukon
Yukon, FL Community Profile

Ghost towns in Florida
Jacksonville metropolitan area
Former populated places in Duval County, Florida
1963 disestablishments in Florida
Populated places disestablished in 1963